Belle Meade can refer to:

 Belle Meade, Tennessee, a city
 The Belle Meade Plantation located there
 Belle Meade, Memphis, a neighborhood in Memphis, Tennessee, USA
 Belle Meade, Virginia, an unincorporated community
 Belle Meade (Miami), a neighborhood within the Upper Eastside district of the city of Miami, Florida, USA

See also
Belle Mead, New Jersey
Bellemeade, Kentucky